Esan West is a Local Government Area of Edo State, Nigeria. Its headquarters are in the town of Ekpoma.
 
It has an area of 502 km and Esan West (Ekpoma) has an estimated population of over 190,000 people which consists of an adult male population of over 60,000 and adult female population of over 60,000. The postal code of the area is 310.

It has an area of 502 km and a population density of 333.3/km [2016]

Towns and villages 
Ekpoma, Iruekpen, Ujemen, Idumebo, Ihumudumu, Uhiele, Emuhi, Ogwa, Ekhiro, Ukpenu, Ujoelen Eguare, Emaudo, Egoro Amede, Egoro Naoka, Ebhakuala, Ukhun, Idoa, Urohi, Akahio, Illeh, Ujiogba.

Economic mainstays 
Cottage industries, Farming, Wood processing, Furniture making.

Tourist centers and attractions 
Commemorative statue of Professor Ambrose Alli, Ibiekuma River and Onojie Palaces; Ukhun Shrine, Oghedekpe River, Orosun Water falls in Ukhun Kingdom.

Natural resources 
Limestone and Timber.

Major agricultural products 
Cocoa, Oil palm, Rubber, Kola, Cassava, Cocoyam, Pineapple, Plantain, Rice and Citrus fruits, Pepper, Tomatoes.

Health facilities 
The Professor Ambrose Alli University Teaching Hospital is at Ekpoma, along with various public health centers, private and public hospitals, clinics and maternity homes.

Educational facilities 
In addition to the Ambrose Alli University, Ekpoma and Samuel Adegboyega University, Ogwa;  there are forty eight (48) primary schools and twelve Secondary Schools in Ekpoma.

Hubus-Salam Educational Foundation, Mount Camel School John Bosco International School, Christ Foundation Nursery and Primary School, Moscow International School; Christ the King Nursery & Primary School, Christ Adam College, Cosmopolitan Church Primary School, Ujoelen Grammar School, Ujoelen Ekpoma.

References

Local Government Areas in Edo State